The Keystone Party of Pennsylvania is a third party in Pennsylvania founded in 2022.

History

Establishment
The party was founded by members of the Libertarian Party of Pennsylvania who felt the Libertarian Party was "veering too hard to the right". The party's first and current chairman is former Chairman of the York County branch of the Libertarian Party, Gus Tatlas. The Keystone Party was founded in 2022 with the stated goal of bridging the gap between the two main parties in the state and to better represent issues relevant to Pennsylvanians. Instead of building their party on divisive rhetoric, they claim to seek to build an inclusive dialogue of political issues Pennsylvanians can agree on like governmental reform, fair elections, social and criminal justice reform, individual rights and taxation.

2022 Election in Pennsylvania
The party's candidates received ballot access on August 1 for the 2022 Pennsylvania elections by receiving more than 5,000 signatures of registered voters.

Their candidate for the 2022 United States Senate election in Pennsylvania was Dan Wassmer. Wassmer is a lawyer originally from Nassau County, New York, but now lives in Pike County. A former Libertarian, he was the Libertarian candidate for Attorney General in 2020. He received 25,808 votes or 0.5% of the electorate placing him in last place among options on the ballot.

Their candidates for the 2022 Pennsylvania gubernatorial election where Joseph P. Soloski for Governor and Nicole Shultz for Lieutenant Governor. Soloski is an accountant from Centre County and former Libertarian. He ran for the Pennsylvania House of Representatives, District 81 in 2016 and in the 2020 Pennsylvania State Treasurer election both as a Libertarian. He initially sought the nomination from the Libertarian party, but withdrew and joined the Keystone party. Shultz is another former Libertarian. She originally ran as a candidate for the Libertarian nominee for Lt. Governor, withdrew, and announced her candidacy for the Libertarian nominee for governor. Upon losing that election she joined the Keystone party and successfully sought their bid for Lt. Governor. She is an auditor from Windsor Township, York County, Pennsylvania and had been the Pennsylvania Libertarian Party's treasurer from 2021 to 2022. Soloski and Shultz's ticket got 20,036 votes or 0.4% of the electorate. Like Wassmer, this put them in last place for candidates on the ballot.

The party also stood two candidates for the Pennsylvania House of Representatives in district 93 and district 104 respectively. In district 93 Keystone candidate Kristine Cousler-Womack received 887 votes, or 3% of the electorate falling behind both the incumbent Mike Jones and his Democrat challenger Chris Rodkey. In district 104, Keystone candidate David Kocur received the best showing of the party in terms of percentage. He received 4,838 votes or 29.5% of the electorate, falling behind Democrat candidate Dave Madsen.

Post 2022 Election

Party founder and leader Gus Tatlas voiced his support for the bi-partisan MarchOnHarrisburg movement, led by Rabbi Michael Pollack, on November 27 2022. The movement seeks to implement legislation that would result in a "gift ban" to outlaw the ability for members of the Pennsylvania General Assembly to receive "gifts" in exchange for voting a certain way on bills.

Election results

Platform
The Party's officially endorsed stances are:
 Part-time Legislature. Lawmakers should be required to spend half the year living among their constituents.
Term Limits. Legislatures should have an undefined but "reasonable" term limit to prevent gridlock.
Anti-corruption. Seeking greater enforcement of anti-corruption efforts across the state.
Protection of Individual Rights. Curtailing government overreach and state authority into the lives of its citizens. Ending any government interference over the bodies of individuals. Right to bear arms under the Second Amendment to the United States Constitution. Total marriage equality.
Reduction of Overreaching Authority. Reducing the number of un-elected officials in the state and ending extra-legislative rule making.
Budget Balancing. The state should not spend more than it receives in revenue.
Election reform. Increasing ballot access to third parties. Having independent redistricting commissions. Implement a form of ranked voting and blanket primaries in Pennsylvania.
Criminal justice reform. Expungement of convictions for victimless crimes. Restoration of rights to convicts. Implement jury nullification in Pennsylvania.
School choice. Allowing parents to determine which school their children attend be it public, private, charter, or home schooled.
Environmentalism. Moving Pennsylvania towards green energy with no energy source being subsidized with tax dollars and allowing class action lawsuits against polluters.
Free Markets. Reducing the amount of government interference in the market to a minimum. Ending property tax in Pennsylvania. Ending land use regulations to their simplest forms.
Cryptocurrency. removing any and all government regulations on cryptocurrency.
Immigration. Reducing government inefficiency regarding immigration. Allowing "peaceful people" to seek citizenship.
Privacy. Protection of privacy as a fundamental right including banking secrecy laws.
National Guard. Removing any federal control over the Pennsylvania National Guard.

References

External links
 Official party website

2022 establishments in the United States
Political parties established in 2022